Dream Dancing may refer to:

Dream Dancing (Eddie Higgins album), 1978
Dream Dancing (Ella Fitzgerald album), 1978
Dream Dancing (Jimmy Knepper album), 1986
"Dream Dancing" (Cole Porter song) by Cole Porter in 1941

See also
Dancing the Dream
Dance of a Dream
Dream Dancer